Andrejs Elksniņš (born 1982) is a Latvian politician and the current Mayor of Daugavpils. He is a member of the Harmony party and was a deputy of the 12th Saeima. He is of Latvian and Russian descent.

Elksniņš took office as Mayor of Daugavpils, the second largest city in the country, on 26 June 2017 but was replaced by Rihards Eigims after just two months in office on September 2. After the coalition led by Eigims collapsed on 22 November 2018, Elksniņš was re-elected as mayor on 17 January 2019 and removed from office on June 11, 2020. The city was then led by Igors Prelatovs, until Elksniņš was reelected and approved as mayor after the 2021 Latvian municipal elections un July 1.

References

External links
Official Facebook page (in Russian and Latvian)
Profile on the website of the Saeima

1982 births
Living people
Politicians from Riga
Social Democratic Party "Harmony" politicians
Deputies of the 11th Saeima
Deputies of the 12th Saeima